Stylianos "Stelios" Poulianitis (born April 3, 1995) is a Greek professional basketball player for Peristeri of the Greek Basket League. He is a 1.90 m (6 ft 2 in) tall combo guard.

Professional career
Poulianitis began his pro career with the Greek League club Aris Thessaloniki, in the 2013–14 season. He was loaned to the Greek club Koroivos Amaliadas for the 2015–16 season, and to the Greek club Aries Trikala, for the 2016–17 season. He then returned to Aris for the 2017–18 season.

On June 14, 2018, Poulianitis left Aris and joined Kymis of the Greek Basket League. On August 16, 2019, Poulianitis signed a two-year deal with Kolossos Rodou, but only spent one season with them. 

After winning the 2nd division championship with Apollon Patras in the 2020-2021 season, Poulianitis agreed to return to Aris on August 11, 2021. In 23 games, he averaged 4.8 points, 1.4 rebounds, 1.4 assists and 0.6 steals, playing around 19 minutes per contest.

On July 9, 2022, Poulianitis signed a two-year (1+1) contract with Peristeri.

Greek national team
Poulianitis was a member of the Greek junior national teams. With the junior national teams of Greece, Poulianitis played at the 2011 FIBA Europe Under-16 Championship, the 2014 FIBA Europe Under-20 Championship, and the 2015 FIBA Europe Under-20 Championship.

Personal
Poulianitis has origin from Trikala. His father Vangelis is a former basketball player who played in the Greek Basketball League with Panellinios and Philippos Thessaloniki.

References

External links
FIBA Profile (archive)
FIBA Europe Profile
Eurobasket.com Profile
Greek Basket League Profile 
Interperformances.com Profile

1995 births
Living people
Apollon Patras B.C. players
Aries Trikala B.C. players
Aris B.C. players
Greek Basket League players
Greek men's basketball players
Kolossos Rodou B.C. players
Koroivos B.C. players
Kymis B.C. players
Peristeri B.C. players
Point guards
Basketball players from Thessaloniki